Ámbar Past (born 1949) is a US-born poet and visual artist. She has been a Mexican citizen since 1972 and works out of San Cristóbal de las Casas, Chiapas where, in 1975, she founded Taller Leñateros.

References

1949 births
Living people
Mexican poets
Mexican artists
Writers from Chiapas